Throwbacks is the final album recorded by Nat & Alex Wolff under the name "The Naked Brothers Band" and the soundtrack to the third and final season of the show of the same name. Under the working title "Songs of Season 3," due to post-production problems, it was originally cancelled, until it was announced on September 19, 2013 to be released as a Nat & Alex Wolff album instead of a Naked Brothers Band album on October 15, 2013, under the title Throwbacks. One song that was recorded for the intended season 3 soundtrack, "Face in the Hall", which later appeared in the iCarly soundtrack, was not included on the album.

Background

Writing
The song "Yes We Can", which features Natasha Bedingfield and Leon Thomas III, was inspired by the presidency of Barack Obama.

Recording
Recording for the album took place in the Summer of 2008 in New York.

Track listing

References

External links
 Visit Website!
 Watch Episodes!

Television soundtracks
Columbia Records soundtracks
Pop rock soundtracks